Zond 2 was a Soviet space probe, a member of the Zond program, and was the sixth Soviet spacecraft to attempt a flyby of Mars. (See Exploration of Mars) It was launched on November 30, 1964 at 13:12 UTC onboard Molniya 8K78 launch vehicle from Baikonur Cosmodrome, Kazakhstan, USSR. The spacecraft was intended to survey Mars but lost communication before arrival.

History
Zond-2 carried a phototelevision camera of the same type later used to photograph the Moon on Zond 3.  The camera system also included two ultraviolet spectrometers.  As on Mars 1, an infrared spectrometer was installed to search for signs of methane on Mars.

Zond 2 also carried six PPTs that served as actuators of the attitude control system. They were the first PPTs used on a spacecraft. The PPT propulsion system was tested during 70 minutes.

Zond 2, a Mars 3MV-4A craft, was launched on November 30, 1964. During some maneuvering in early May 1965, communications were lost.

Scientific Instruments 

 Radiation Detector
 Charged Particle Detector
 Magnetometer
 Piezoelectric Detector
 Radio Telescope
 Nuclear Component of Cosmic-ray Experiment
 Ultraviolet and Roentgen Solar Radiation Experiment
 Imaging System

See also

 List of missions to Mars
Chronology of Mars Missions

References

External links
 NASA (NSSDC) information on Zond 2
 "The Mystery of Zond 2" by Andrew Lepage, EJASA April, 1991

Zond program
Soviet Mars missions
Missions to Mars
Derelict space probes
Derelict satellites in heliocentric orbit
Spacecraft launched in 1964
1964 in the Soviet Union